Joshua James Roenicke (born August 4, 1982) is an American former professional baseball pitcher. He most recently pitched for the Uni-President Lions of the Chinese Professional Baseball League (CPBL). He has played in Major League Baseball (MLB) for the Cincinnati Reds, Toronto Blue Jays, Colorado Rockies and Minnesota Twins.

Career

Cincinnati Reds
Roenicke was drafted by the Cincinnati Reds in the 10th round of the 2006 Major League Baseball Draft out of UCLA where he was both an outfielder and a relief pitcher, as well as a defensive back and kick returner on the UCLA football team. Beginning his professional career with the Gulf Coast Reds, Roenicke pitched 8 innings and gave up only one run. He was promoted to the Rookie level Billings Mustangs where he finished 2006. He began 2007 with the High-A Sarasota Reds before being promoted to Double-A Chattanooga. Combined, he had a 3–2 record with a 2.31 ERA, 56 strikeouts, and 24 saves. Roenicke remained in Chattanooga to begin 2008, but was promoted to Triple-A Louisville after 22 appearances. In 35 games for Louisville, he had a 2.54 ERA and was promoted to the majors on September 9.

Roenicke made his major league debut on September 13, walking, striking out, and hitting 1 batter each.

Toronto Blue Jays
On July 31, 2009, he was traded to the Toronto Blue Jays along with Edwin Encarnación and Zach Stewart, in exchange for Scott Rolen and cash considerations

In 2 seasons with the Blue Jays, Roenicke went 1-0 with a 6.38 ERA in 29 games

Colorado Rockies
On June 2, 2011, Roenicke was claimed off waivers by the Colorado Rockies and was optioned to Triple-A Colorado Springs.

In 2 seasons with the Rockies, Roenicke went 4-2 with a 3.33 ERA in 82 games, most of them coming in 2012.

Minnesota Twins
The Minnesota Twins claimed him off waivers on November 2, 2012. He was outrighted to the Triple-A Rochester Red Wings on October 2, 2013.

Washington Nationals
Roenicke signed a minor league contract (including a spring training invitation) with the Washington Nationals on February 14, 2014. After pitching in 23 games for the team's Triple-A affiliate Syracuse Chiefs, he was released on August 4, 2014.

Colorado Rockies
Roenicke signed a minor league deal with the Colorado Rockies on August 12, 2014. He pitched in 6 games for their Triple-A affiliate.

Milwaukee Brewers
Roenicke signed a minor league with the Brewers on February 12. He was 7-12 with a 6.15 ERA for their Triple-A affiliate.

Los Angeles Angels of Anaheim
Roenicke signed a minor league deal with the Los Angeles Angels of Anaheim on March 7, 2016. He spent 2016 split between the Angels' Advanced-A, Double-A, and Triple-A teams.

Pericos de Puebla
On February 21, 2017, Roenicke signed with the Pericos de Puebla of the Mexican League. He finished the season with a 7-5 record and a 2.70 ERA in 20 starts for the Pericos, getting selected to the Mexican League All-Star Game (South Division) and carrying the club to its second consecutive championship appearance.

Uni-President Lions
On February 9, 2018, Roenicke signed with the Uni-President Lions of the Chinese Professional Baseball League. In 26 starts, Roenicke posted a league-leading 3.17 ERA across 156 innings pitched. He re-signed with the Uni-Lions for the 2019 season. Roenicke recorded a 3.50 ERA and 1.17 WHIP over 105.1 innings. He later re-signed with the team for the 2020 season. Roenicke was released on August 30, 2020, after tearing a ligament in his pitching elbow.

Pitching style
Roenicke throws five pitches. He has a four-seam fastball thrown at 91–95 mph, a two-seam fastball at 91–94, a slider (82–86), a curveball (76–79), and an occasional changeup (83–85). He does not use his changeup against right-handed hitters. His primary fastball against righties is the four-seamer, while he leans toward the two-seamer against lefties. Despite average to above-average whiff rates on his pitches, he strikes hitters out at a rate well below one per inning.

Personal life
Roenicke, who grew up in Nevada City, California, comes from a baseball family as his brother Jason played in Toronto's minor league system in 2008-2009, his father Gary played 12 major league seasons from 1976 to 1988 and is currently a scout in the Baltimore Orioles organization, and his uncle Ron played 8 seasons from 1981 to 1988 and was previously the manager of the Milwaukee Brewers from 2011 to 2015 and the Boston Red Sox in 2020. 

Roenicke is the brother-in-law of former Colorado Rockies outfielder Ian Desmond, having married Desmond's sister Nikki in 2010.

See also

 List of second-generation Major League Baseball players

References

External links

Josh Roenicke at CPBL

1982 births
Living people
American expatriate baseball players in Canada
American expatriate baseball players in Mexico
American expatriate baseball players in Taiwan
Baseball players from Baltimore
Billings Mustangs players
Chattanooga Lookouts players
Cincinnati Reds players
Colorado Rockies players
Colorado Springs Sky Sox players
Gulf Coast Reds players
Las Vegas 51s players
Louisville Bats players
Major League Baseball pitchers
Mexican League baseball pitchers
Minnesota Twins players
Navegantes del Magallanes players
American expatriate baseball players in Venezuela
People from Nevada City, California
Pericos de Puebla players
Sarasota Reds players
Uni-President Lions players
Syracuse Chiefs players
Toronto Blue Jays players
UCLA Bruins baseball players
UCLA Bruins football players